Natasha Pace (born 10 December 1974) is a Maltese footballer who plays as a defender for First Division club Mosta FC. She has been a member of the Malta women's national team.

References

1974 births
Living people
Women's association football defenders
Maltese women's footballers
Malta women's international footballers
Mosta F.C. players